Platypodia eydouxi, also called the red-eyed xanthid crab, is a crab that belongs to the family Xanthiidae.

References

Xanthoidea
Crustaceans described in 1865